The 2022–23 Coppa Italia (branded as the Coppa Italia Frecciarossa for sponsorship reasons from the second round) is the 76th edition of the national cup in Italian football. There are 44 participating teams.

Match times up to 30 October 2022 and from 26 March 2023 were CEST (UTC+2). Times on interim ("winter") days were CET (UTC+1). Inter Milan are the defending champions.

Participating teams

Format and seeding
Teams entered the competition at various stages, as follows:
 First phase (one-legged fixtures)
 Preliminary round: four teams from Serie C and 4 Serie B teams started the tournament
 Round of 64: the four winners were joined by 16 Serie B teams and 12 teams from Serie A
 Round of 32: the 16 winners faced each other
 Second phase
 Round of 16 (one-legged): the eight winners will be joined by Serie A clubs, seeded 1–8
 Quarter-finals (one-legged): the eight winners will face each other
 Semi-finals (two-legged): the four winners will face each other
 Final (one-legged): the two winners will face each other

Round dates

Preliminary round
A total of eight teams from Serie B and Serie C competed in this round, four of which advanced.

Round of 64
A total of 32 teams (4 winners from the preliminary round, the remaining 16 teams from Serie B and 12 Serie A teams seeded 9–20) competed in this round, 16 of which advanced to the second round.

Round of 32
The 16 winning teams from the first round competed in the second round, 8 of which advanced to the round of 16.

Bracket

Round of 16
The round of 16 matches were played between the eight winners from the second round and clubs seeded 1–8 in the 2021–22 Serie A. Serie B sides Parma and Genoa were the lowest-tier teams in the draw.

Quarter-finals
The quarter-final matches were played between clubs advancing from the round of 16.

Semi-finals
Semi-finals (a two-legged round) will be played between clubs advancing from the quarter-finals.

First leg

Second leg

Final

Top goalscorers 

Players in bold are still active in the competition.

References

Coppa Italia seasons
Coppa Italia
Italy